Jake Byrne (born January 24, 1990) is a former American football tight end. He played college football at University of Wisconsin-Madison.

NFL career

New Orleans Saints
After going undrafted during the 2012 NFL Draft, Byrne was signed by the New Orleans Saints as an undrafted free agent on April 29, 2012. He was released on August 27, 2012 during final cuts.

Houston Texans
On January 8, 2013, Byrne was signed to the Houston Texans' practice squad. He was released by the Texans on September 1, 2013.

San Diego Chargers
On September 2, 2013, Byrne was signed to the San Diego Chargers' practice squad.

Second stint with the Texans
On October 9, 2013, Byrne was signed of the Chargers' practice squad by the Texans. Byrne appeared in 7 games, before being released on December 14, 2013.

Kansas City Chiefs
On December 18, 2013, Byrne was signed to the Kansas City Chiefs' practice squad.

Second stint with the Chargers
On December 23, 2013, Byrne was signed off the Chiefs' practice squad by the Chargers. The Chargers released Byrne on August 25, 2014.

References

External links
 Houston Texans bio
 Jake Byrne transactions
 San Diego Chargers bio
 Wisconsin Badgers bio

Living people
American football tight ends
Wisconsin Badgers football players
Houston Texans players
San Diego Chargers players
Players of American football from Arkansas
Sportspeople from Rogers, Arkansas
1990 births